Ceiba is a barrio in the municipality of Las Piedras, Puerto Rico. Its population in 2010 was 2,500.

See also

 List of communities in Puerto Rico

References

Barrios of Las Piedras, Puerto Rico